James Maurice (November 7, 1814 – August 4, 1884) was an American lawyer and politician who served one term as a United States Representative from New York from 1853 to 1855.

Life
Born in New York City, he attended Broad Street Academy and became a clerk in a law office at the age of twelve years. He studied law, was admitted to the bar in 1835, and practiced in Maspeth.

Political career 
He was a member of the New York State Assembly (Queens Co.) in 1851; and was a delegate to the Democratic state conventions of 1851, 1853 and 1856.

Maurice was elected as a Democrat to the 33rd United States Congress, holding office from March 4, 1853, to March 3, 1855. Afterwards he resumed the practice of law, and declined the nomination as justice of the New York Supreme Court in 1865.

He was again a member of the State Assembly (Queens Co., 2nd D.) in 1866.

Death 
He died in Maspeth on August 4, 1884; interment was in Mount Olivet Cemetery.

References

External links
 

1814 births
1884 deaths
People from Maspeth, Queens
New York (state) lawyers
Democratic Party members of the New York State Assembly
Democratic Party members of the United States House of Representatives from New York (state)
Burials at Mount Olivet Cemetery (Queens)
19th-century American politicians
19th-century American lawyers